Vera Zvonareva was the defending champion and successfully defended her title by defeating Meghann Shaughnessy 7–6(7–3), 6–2 in the final.

Seeds

Draw

Finals

Top half

Bottom half

References
 Main and Qualifying Rounds

2005 WTA Tour
2005 Singles